The 2009 All-Ireland Under-21 Football Championship was the 46th staging of the All-Ireland Under-21 Football Championship since its establishment by the Gaelic Athletic Association in 1964.

Kerry entered the championship as defending champions, however, they were defeated by Cork in the Munster quarter-final.

On 4 May 2009, Cork won the championship following a 1-13 to 2-9 defeat of Down in the All-Ireland final. This was their 11th All-Ireland title overall and their first in two championship seasons.

Results

All-Ireland Under-21 Football Championship

Semi-finals

Final

References

2007
All-Ireland Under-21 Football Championship